Crime District is a French television channel from Luxembourg broadcasting news reports and criminal investigations. It belongs to AB Groupe via its subsidiary AB Luxembourg S.A..

History
Crime District began broadcasting on February 11, 2016 exclusively in the Orange TV package
. The channel is now broadcast on Bis Télévisions as well as on the applications of Molotov TV. Since December 15, 2016, it is also broadcast in Switzerland in the Swisscom TV offer.

Programming

References

External links
 

Mediawan Thematics
Television stations in France
Television channels and stations established in 2016
French-language television stations
Television networks in Luxembourg